Helen Moore Johnson (1889  – 1967) was a Guggenheim Fellow (1927) appointed for research in Jainism. Her work includes the English translation of the hagiographical work Trishashti Shalaka Purusha in six volumes. She published several articles in Journal of the American Oriental Society, American Journal of Philology.

Career history 

 Studies at University of Missouri (A.B. 1907, M.A. 1908)
 University of Wisconsin, Ph.D., 1912
 Professor, 1913–16, Oklahoma College for Women
 Professor of Latin and Greek, 1919–20, Oxford College for Women
 Alice Freeman Palmer Memorial Fellow, in India, 1920–21
 Johnston Scholar, The Johns Hopkins University, 1924–26

References 

1889 births
1967 deaths